Edward Lambert (born 1951) is an English composer who has written chamber music, vocal and choral works, and chamber operas. He is also a conductor and pianist.

Study 

Edward Lambert was educated at Christ's Hospital and read music at Merton College, Oxford (1970–1973) where he was the College's Choirmaster and conductor of the Kodály Choir. Lambert then trained as an opera repetiteur at the London Opera Centre (1973–74) while studying piano with Paul Hamburger. He went on to study composition under John Lambert (no relation) at the Royal College of Music (1976–1977).

Career 

Lambert spent two years (1974–1976) working as repetiteur and assistant kapellmeister at the Schleswig-Holsteinisches Landestheater in the North German town of Flensburg. There he came into contact with the new music of the 1960s and 1970s. In 1976 he attended Darmstadt composers' course when György Ligeti was lecturing there: Epitaph was selected for performance.  The Park Lane Players gave performances of the Fantasy Trio (1977) and the Canzonetta (Sonatina) for Clarinet & Piano.
As a result of attending the Gulbenkian course for composers and choreographers in 1977, led by Robert Cohan, he wrote Ephialtes (1978) for Scottish Ballet, Invention (1978) and Maxims, Hymn, Riddle (1982) for Jonathan Burrows and the Spiral Dance Company.
While serving his apprenticeship in Germany, he also worked at the Wexford Festival Ireland (1974–1976); in 1977 he joined the music staff of the Royal Opera House Covent Garden, (full-time 1977–1982, continuing freelance until 1996).

His Piano Quartet Emplay was the winner of the Humphrey Searle Chamber Music Competition and played twice in the finals at the Purcell Room in 1983. The Chamber Concerto (1983) was performed by Lontano at the 1984 Bath International Music Festival. The Mass for Four Voices was performed at the Huddersfield Contemporary Music Festival and broadcast on BBC Radio 3.
In the 1980s and 1990s Lambert was involved in the Royal Opera's developing outreach program around the country which explored innovative ways of composing operas alongside children and amateurs (often in collaboration with the education arm of the Metropolitan Opera, New York): this resulted in several opera projects including The Treasure and a Tale, (a fusion of Beowulf and the Sutton Hoo discovery in collaboration with the British Museum) performed at the Snape Maltings and The Button Moulder (1989–90), a specially commissioned work for teenagers adapted by Lambert from Ibsen's Peer Gynt. This production travelled to the US.
The chamber opera Caedmon based on a play by Christopher Fry was produced by the Royal Opera at the Donmar Warehouse in May 1989 with Christopher Gillett in the title role. All in the Mind (2004) was commissioned by W11 Opera, also to Lambert's own libretto, and performed at the Britten Theatre in London.
Several works have been performed in the Newbury area in Berkshire, England, where he now lives. He was musical director of the Newbury Chamber Choir (2002-2020) and in 2013 formed a group called The Music Troupe which has since performed regularly at the annual Tête à Tête Opera Festival in London.

In 2014 The Music Troupe mounted productions of Six Characters in Search of a Stage, The Inarticulate Burr, Stillleben (Sonata for Strings as dance), and The Catfish Conundrum. There followed Opera With a Title, The Cloak and Dagger Affair and The Parting (after Lorca), The Oval Portrait (after Poe), The Art of Venus (2017)  and Apollo's Mission (2019).

Works 
 Last Party on Earth
The Duchess of Padua
 Apollo's Mission
In Five Years' Time
Buster's Trip
 The Butterfly's Spell
 The Parting
 The Art of Venus
 The Cloak and Dagger Affair
 Yin and Yang Cantata
 The Visit to the Sepulchre
 Opera with a Title
 An Opera of Daniel
 Aspects of 'Work' (piano duo)
 The Catfish Conundrum (opera)
 The Inarticulate Burr
 Shelley's Hymm
 The Oval Portrait
 Four Ideas for 2 oboes
 Six Characters in Search of a Stage (opera)
 The First Christmas Tree
 Funeral Sentences
 Sonata for Strings
 Short Story
 More or less? for oboe & piano
 Laugh Out Loud for clarinet & piano
 Brighter Than The Sun (Christmas Cantata)
 Rossetti Requiem
 Music for 4 Bassoons
 Songs for a Florentine Apollo
 Speed Matters for violin & harp
 Trio Sonata in D
 The Crucifixion
 Concerto Cubico
 du barocque...
 All in the Mind (opera)
 The Drean That Hath No Bottom (opera)
 Te Deum
 Symphony of Joys and of Sorrows
 String Quartet no 3
 String Quartet no 2
 Praise the Lord
 Meditation on a Ruin
 Magnificat & Nunc Dimittis
 Opening Chapters
 The Treasure and a Tale (opera)
 Ten Riddles
 The Button Moulder (opera)
 Caedmon (opera)
 Chamber Concerto
 Mass for Four Voices
 Piano Quartet 'Emplay'
 Invention for violin & piano
 Fantasy Trio
 Maxims, Hymn, Riddle
 3 Pieces for lute
 Canzonetta for clarinet & piano
 Pange Lingua
 String Quartet no 1

References

External links 

 Catalogue of works edwardlambert.co.uk
 Works at the International Music Score Library Project imslp.org/wiki/Category:Lambert,_Edward
 British Academy of Songwriters and Composers basca.org
 Works at the British Music Collection soundandmusic.org
 The Music Troupe musictroupe.co.uk
 Newbury Chamber Choir newburychamberchoir.co.uk

1951 births
Living people
21st-century classical composers
20th-century classical composers
English classical composers
Musicians from London
People educated at Christ's Hospital
English male classical composers
20th-century English composers
Alumni of Merton College, Oxford
20th-century British male musicians
21st-century British male musicians